The Eastern Shore Public Library is a library system that serves counties of Accomack and Northampton counties in Virginia. The library system is within Region 3 of the Virginia Library Association (VLA).

Service area 
According to the FY 2014 Institute of Museum and Library Services Data Catalog, the Library System has a service area population of 45,768 with 1 central library and 3 branch libraries.

History 
The Eastern Shore Public Library was started on January 16, 1957 in Accomac's Community Hall. The library used a bookmobile with stops in 50 locations. The library became a regional library system on July 1, 1958. The Main Library, the primary library, located in Accomac. The Northhampton Free Library is a branch library. Cape Charles Memorial Library and Chincoteague Island Library are affiliated locations.

Branches 
 Cape Charles Memorial Library (Cape Charles)
 Chincoteague Island Library (Chincoteague)
 Main Library (Accomac)
 Northampton Free Library (Nassawadox)

External links 
 Eastern Shore Public Library
 Friends of the Eastern Shore Public Library
 Eastern Shore Public Library Foundation
 Cape Charles Memorial Library
 Chincoteague Island Library
 Main Library
 Northampton Free Library

References 

Public libraries in Virginia
Education in Accomack County, Virginia
Northampton County, Virginia
Libraries established in 1957
1957 establishments in Virginia